America's Best may refer to:

 America's Best Franchising, operator of America's Best Inn and other lodging brands
 Vantage Hospitality, operator of America's Best Value Inn
 America's Best Comics
 America's Best Contacts & Eyeglasses
 America's Best Dance Crew